Caesar Colclough (1766–1842) was a Member of Parliament for Wexford County (Parliament of Ireland constituency).

References 

1766 births

1842 deaths